The 2005–06 Primeira Liga was the 72nd edition of top flight of Portuguese football. It started on 19 August 2005 with a match between Sporting CP and Belenenses and ended on 7 May 2006. The league was contested by 18 clubs with Benfica as defending champions. 

Porto and Sporting CP were both qualified for the 2005–06 UEFA Champions League group stage, and Benfica qualified for the UEFA Champions League qualifying round; Braga, Nacional and Vitória de Setúbal qualified for the 2006–07 UEFA Cup; in opposite, with the league dropping to 16 teams, four teams were relegated to the Liga de Honra; Gil Vicente, Rio Ave, Vitória de Guimarães and Penafiel. Meyong was the top scorer with 17 goals.

The season's first goal was scored by Rogério, who scored a 39th-minute goal for Sporting against Belenenses. The first yellow card of the season was given to Sporting's Fábio Rochemback in the opening game of the season, and the first red card was given to Benfica's João Pereira in his club's away draw against Académica de Coimbra.

Promotion and relegation

Teams relegated to Liga de Honra
Moreirense
Beira-Mar
Estoril

Moreirense, Beira-Mar and Estoril were relegated to the Liga de Honra following their final classification in 2004–05 season.

Teams promoted from Liga de Honra
Estrela da Amadora
Paços de Ferreira
Naval 1º de Maio

The other three teams were replaced by Estrela da Amadora, Paços de Ferreira and Naval 1º de Maio from the Liga de Honra.

Club information

League table

Results

Top goal scorers

Awards

Footballer of the Year
The Footballer of the Year award was won by the Portuguese Ricardo Quaresma of Porto, for a second successive season.

Portuguese Golden Shoe
The Portuguese Golden Shoe award was won by the Cameroonian Albert Meyong of Belenenses, scoring 17 goals.

References

External links
Portuguese Liga 2005-06 at rsssf.com

Primeira Liga seasons
Port
1